Paul Turner may refer to:

 Paul Turner (American football coach), American football coach
 Paul Turner (rugby league) (born 2000), New Zealand rugby league footballer
 Paul Turner (rugby union) (born 1960), Welsh rugby union footballer and coach
 Paul Turner (tackle), American college football player
 Paul Turner (wide receiver) (born 1993), American football wide receiver
 Paul Turner (director) (1945-2019), Welsh film director
 Paul Turner (bassist) (born 1968), English bassist
 Paul Turner (pastor) (died 1980), active in the integration of Clinton High School in Tennessee
 Paul E. Turner, evolutionary biologist
 Paul Turner, founder of RockShox and Maverick Bikes
 Paul Turner, character in Submarine Seahawk